Rhamphinina is a genus of parasitic flies in the family Tachinidae.

Species
Rhamphinina discalis (Townsend, 1915)
Rhamphinina pica (Fabricius, 1805)

References

Dexiinae
Diptera of South America
Diptera of North America
Tachinidae genera
Taxa named by Jacques-Marie-Frangile Bigot